Ocnogyna bellieri is a moth of the family Erebidae. It was described by Julius Lederer in 1855. It is found in Turkey.

Subspecies
Ocnogyna bellieri bellieri
Ocnogyna bellieri berytta (Staudinger, 1895)

References

Spilosomina
Moths described in 1855